Mississippi Highway 48 (MS 48) is a state highway in southern Mississippi.

Route description

MS 48 begins in Amite County in the town of Centreville at an intersection with MS 24/MS 33 at the eastern edge of town, with the road continuing westward as E Howard Street into downtown. It immediately leaves the town and heads east through woodlands, with some farms here and there, for several miles to pass through the community of Ariel and become concurrent (overlapped) with MS 569 before crossing the West Fork of the Amite River and entering the town of Liberty. The highway enters town along S Broad Street, passing through a neighborhood before entering downtown and becoming concurrent with MS 24 (Main Street) at an intersection on the corner of the Amite County Courthouse. MS 24/MS 48/MS 569 head east along Main Street straight the center of the downtown business district, where they have an intersection with MS 584 (Gillsburg Road) and MS 569 splits off (along Old Jackson Road), and MS 24/MS 48 leave downtown and pass through neighborhoods before leaving Liberty and traveling through a mix of farmland and wooded areas for several miles, where they cross the East Fork of the Amite River, before entering Pike County.

MS 24/MS 48 travel through woodlands, where they cross the Tangipahoa River about 1.5 miles north of Lake Tangipahoa, before MS 48 splits and heads south, directly passing through Percy Quin State Park. MS 48 now has a rather large interchange with I-55 (Exit 10) as it curves eastward again to enter the town of Magnolia along Bay Street and pass through some neighborhoods. It enters downtown and has an intersection with US 51 (Clark Avenue) before passing by the Pike County Courthouse and crossing over a railroad track. The highway crosses a bridge over the Little Tangipahoa River to leave Magnolia and travel southeast through mostly farmland for several miles to enter Walthall County.

MS 48 immediately crosses the Bogue Chitto River and travels eastward through more farmland before the Tylertown city limits and becoming concurrent with MS 198. They travel along Beulah Avenue through some neighborhoods for several blocks before entering downtown and having an intersection with MS 27 (Franklinton Street/Ball Avenue) near the Walthall County Courthouse. MS 48/MS 198 continue through downtown for several blocks before leaving and passing through neighborhoods again, where they cross Magees Creek and MS 48 splits off to leave Tylertown and wind its way southeast through farmland for several miles (where it passes through the community of Dexter) to enter Marion County.

MS 48 curves eastward again and travels through woodlands for several miles before coming to an end in the community of Sandy Hook at an intersection with MS 35, only 2.5 miles north of the Louisiana state line by road.

The entire route of Mississippi Highway 48 is a rural two-lane state highway.

Major intersections

References

External links

048
Transportation in Amite County, Mississippi
Transportation in Pike County, Mississippi
Transportation in Walthall County, Mississippi
Transportation in Marion County, Mississippi